Inquisitor indistinctus is a species of sea snail, a marine gastropod mollusk in the family Pseudomelatomidae, the turrids and allies.

Description
The length of the shell attains 31.3 mm,; its diameter 8.3 mm.

Distribution
This marine species is found off of the Maldives

References

 Sysoev, A.V. (1996b) Deep-sea conoidean gastropods collected by the John Murray Expedition, 1933–34. Bulletin of the Natural History Museum of London, Zoology, 62, 1–30

External links
 

indistinctus
Gastropods described in 1996